The WS Award for Best Original Soundtrack of the Year is one of the three main prizes given by the World Soundtrack Academy to honour the best movie soundtracks.

"†" means that the film won the Academy Award for Best Original Score.

Winners and nominees
 2001 Amélie (Le fabuleux destin d'Amélie Poulain) – Yann Tiersen
 A.I. Artificial Intelligence – John Williams
 Before Night Falls – Carter Burwell
 Hannibal – Hans Zimmer
 Moulin Rouge! – Craig Armstrong and Marius De Vries
 2002 The Lord of the Rings: The Fellowship of the Ring – Howard Shore †
 Black Hawk Down – Hans Zimmer
 Monsters, Inc. – Randy Newman
 Spider-Man – Danny Elfman
 Star Wars: Episode II – Attack of the Clones – John Williams
 2003 Frida – Elliot Goldenthal †
 Catch Me If You Can – John Williams
 Gangs of New York – Howard Shore
 The Hours – Philip Glass
 Road to Perdition – Thomas Newman
 2004 Cold Mountain – Gabriel Yared
 Eternal Sunshine of the Spotless Mind – Jon Brion
 Harry Potter and the Prisoner of Azkaban – John Williams
 Pirates of the Caribbean: The Curse of the Black Pearl – Klaus Badelt and Hans Zimmer
 Shrek 2 – Harry Gregson-Williams
 2005 War of the Worlds – John Williams
 The Aviator – Howard Shore
 Batman Begins – James Newton Howard and Hans Zimmer
 The Bourne Supremacy – John Powell
 Mar adentro (Sea Inside) – Alejandro Amenábar
 2006 The Constant Gardener – Alberto Iglesias
 Brokeback Mountain – Gustavo Santaolalla †
 King Kong – James Newton Howard
 Munich – John Williams
 Pride & Prejudice – Dario Marianelli
 2007 The Fountain – Clint Mansell
 Little Miss Sunshine – Mychael Danna; DeVotchKa
 Notes on a Scandal – Philip Glass
 Shrek the Third – Harry Gregson-Williams
 Zodiac – David Shire
 2008 Atonement – Dario Marianelli †
 3:10 to Yuma – Marco Beltrami
 The Kite Runner – Alberto Iglesias
 There Will Be Blood – Jonny Greenwood
 WALL-E – Thomas Newman
 2009 The Curious Case of Benjamin Button – Alexandre Desplat
 Burn After Reading – Carter Burwell
 Frost/Nixon – Hans Zimmer
 The International – Reinhold Heil, Tom Tykwer & Johnny Klimek
 Slumdog Millionaire – A. R. Rahman †
 2010 Fantastic Mr. Fox – Alexandre Desplat
 Avatar – James Horner
 Where the Wild Things Are – Carter Burwell & Karen Orzolek
 A Single Man – Abel Korzeniowski
 Sherlock Holmes – Hans Zimmer
 2011 Inception – Hans Zimmer
 Black Swan – Clint Mansell
 The King's Speech – Alexandre Desplat
 The Social Network – Trent Reznor, Atticus Ross †
 True Grit – Carter Burwell
 2012 Tinker Tailor Soldier Spy – Alberto Iglesias
 The Ides of March – Alexandre Desplat
 Drive – Cliff Martinez
 Hugo – Howard Shore
 The Adventures of Tintin: The Secret of the Unicorn – John Williams
 2013 Life of Pi – Mychael Danna †
 Anna Karenina – Dario Marianelli
 The Hobbit: An Unexpected Journey – Howard Shore
 The Master – Jonny Greenwood
 Skyfall – Thomas Newman
 2014 The Grand Budapest Hotel – Alexandre Desplat †
 Her – Arcade Fire
 All Is Lost – Alexander Ebert
 Gravity – Steven Price †
 12 Years a Slave – Hans Zimmer
 2015 Birdman – Antonio Sánchez
 Cinderella – Patrick Doyle
 The Imitation Game – Alexandre Desplat
 Interstellar – Hans Zimmer
 The Theory of Everything – Jóhann Jóhannsson

References
World Soundtrack Awards Best Original Soundtrack

External links
 Official site

World Soundtrack Awards